Rodolfo Martín Villa (born 3 October 1934) is a Spanish engineer and politician, who served in various capacities in the cabinets of the Spanish transition to democracy, including interior minister and first deputy prime minister. He is being investigated in Argentina for aggravated homicide and crimes against humanity committed during the 1976 Vitoria massacre.

Early life and education
Villa was born in Santa María del Páramo, León, on 3 October 1934. He holds a university degree in engineering which he obtained from Technical University of Madrid.

Career
Villa is an industrial engineer and tax inspector by profession. In February 1962 he became the head of the Sindicato Español Universitario, the university syndicate of FET y de las JONS. He replaced Jesús Aparicio-Bernal in the post. Villa's tenure ended in December 1964 and Daniel Regalado assumed the post.

Villa was a member of the Union of the Democratic Centre. He was the civil governor of Barcelona until his appointment as minister for trade union relations in 1975. His tenure lasted until 1976.

He was appointed interior minister in the first cabinet of Adolfo Suárez on 5 July 1976, succeeding Manuel Fraga in the post. Villa won a seat in the 1977 general election, the first democratic elections in Spain since 1936, for the UCD, representing León. Following the election he retained his post as interior minister being responsible for internal security, local administration and also, civil rights. He also tried to institutionalize certain reforms about these issues, but he could not manage to realize the reformation of the Spanish police due to the intervention of the Spanish Army. On 6 April 1979, Villa's term as interior minister ended, and he was replaced by Antonio Ibáñez Freire in the post.

In a reshuffle of September 1980, he was appointed minister of the regions in the Suárez cabinet. He then served as first deputy prime minister from 1 December 1981 to 28 July 1982. After holding his seat for the UCD in the 1979 and 1982 general elections, he resigned in February 1983, but returned to the Congress at the 1989 election as a member of the People's Party, representing Madrid, holding his seat in the two subsequent elections before resigning in February 1997.

In addition, he was a board member of the institution Caja de Madrid, a savings and loans institution. On 10 February 1997, he was named as the chairman of the Sociedad Estatal de Participaciones Industriales. From February 1997 to May 2002, he was the chairman of Endesa, a government-controlled electricity group. He became honorary chairman of the company in May 2002.

In 2006, he was appointed chairman of the Sogecable, a Spanish pay-TV provider. His term ended in October 2010, and Manuel Polanco replaced him in the post. In addition, Villa was a member of the advisory committee of FRIDE, now-defunct Madrid-based think tank organization.

Controversy
Argentine human rights lawyers announced in Madrid on 23 April 2013 that three former Spanish ministers of Franco regime, including Villa, should be arrested and tried due to their alleged participation in the killing of Argentinean citizens. Villa is specifically being accused of giving orders of five workers' executions during a labor strike in Vitoria in March 1976.

References

External links

20th-century Spanish businesspeople
20th-century Spanish engineers
1934 births
Living people
People from León, Spain
Union of the Democratic Centre (Spain) politicians
People's Party (Spain) politicians
Deputy Prime Ministers of Spain
Government ministers of Spain
Spanish corporate directors
Members of the constituent Congress of Deputies (Spain)
Members of the 1st Congress of Deputies (Spain)
Members of the 2nd Congress of Deputies (Spain)
Members of the 4th Congress of Deputies (Spain)
Members of the 5th Congress of Deputies (Spain)
Members of the 6th Congress of Deputies (Spain)
Interior ministers of Spain
Civil governors of Barcelona
Spanish industrial engineers
Technical University of Madrid alumni